Santianes is one of nine parishes (administrative divisions) in Ribadesella, a municipality within the province and autonomous community of Asturias, in northern Spain.

Villages
Llovio 
Fríes
Omedina
Santianes

Parishes in Ribadesella